The Throw, or Everything Started on Saturday is a 1976 Soviet science fiction film directed by Serik Raibayev based on the story by Kir Bulychev The Ability to Throw Ball.

Plot
Architect Temirbek Sarsenbaev receives from a mysterious professor the gift of accurately throwing objects at a target, from a long distance and almost without aiming. Coach of the local basketball club "Arman" finds out about this, and invites him to try his hand at the game. And although Temirbek has no natural propensity for basketball, except for the ability to accurately throw the ball, his gift transforms the team which begins to count on Sarsenbaev.

The team, led by the new leader, is winning a series of high-profile victories, and Temirbek himself becomes a real star of basketball. He has fans and female admirers, which he could not even dream about earlier. But success and fame do not bring happiness to Sarsenbaev, he realizes that he could not become a real basketball player.

On the eve of the decisive match, he declares about leaving the club. "Arman" begins to lose without his leader, Temirbek still comes to the game to help the team. Going to the site and having achieved a break in the game, he asks the coach to replace him with a young player, who was always the backup. "Arman" wins, and Sarsenbaev finally leaves the sport after the match.

Cast
Yesbolgan Zhaisanbaev — Temirbek Sarsenbaev (voiced by Yuri Sarantsev)
Asanali Ashimov — Professor
Galina Shetenova — Estula
Lev Tymkin — Andrei Zakharovich, the coach
Jeksen Kairliev — Bakhyt Baymutdin, basketball player
Dzhambul Khudaibergenov — basketball player
Dimash Akhimov — basketball player
N. Yesengaliev — basketball player
B. Seitov — basketball player
Baikenge Belbaev — basketball player
Vitaly Grishko — basketball player
Anaurbek Moldabekov — commentator
Gulnara Rakhimbaeva — assistant director
Gulziya Belbaeva — episode
Rimma Kabdaliyeva — Aigirim
Tanat Zhailibekov — administrator

References

External links

Films based on works by Kir Bulychov
Kazakhstani science fiction films
Soviet science fiction films
1970s science fiction films
Basketball films
Soviet sports films
Soviet television films

Films scored by Aleksandr Zatsepin
Soviet-era Kazakhstani films